In organic chemistry, the Claisen–Schmidt condensation is the reaction between an aldehyde or ketone having an α-hydrogen with an aromatic carbonyl compound lacking an α-hydrogen. This reaction is named after two of its pioneering investigators Rainer Ludwig Claisen and J. G. Schmidt, who independently published on this topic in 1880 and 1881.  An example is the synthesis of dibenzylideneacetone ((1E, 4E)-1,5-diphenylpenta-1,4-dien-3-one).

Quantitative yields in Claisen–Schmidt reactions have been reported in the absence of solvent using sodium hydroxide as the base and plus benzaldehydes. Because the enolizeable nucleophilic carbonyl compound and the electrophilic carbonyl compound are two different chemicals, the Claisen–Schmidt reaction is an example of a crossed aldol process.

References

Condensation reactions
Carbon-carbon bond forming reactions